In Greek mythology, Minos was a King of Crete, son of Zeus and Europa. Every nine years, he made King Aegeus pick seven young boys and seven young girls to be sent to Daedalus's creation, the labyrinth, to be eaten by the Minotaur. After his death, Minos became a judge of the dead in the underworld.

The archeologist Sir Arthur Evans named the Minoan civilization of Crete after him.

Etymology 

"Minos" is often interpreted as the Cretan word for "king" or, by a euhemerist interpretation, the name of a particular king that was subsequently used as a title.

According to La Marle's reading of Linear A, which has been heavily criticized as arbitrary, we should read mwi-nu ro-ja (Minos the king) on a Linear A tablet. La Marle suggests that the name mwi-nu (Minos) is expected to mean 'ascetic' as Sanskrit muni, and fits this explanation to the legend about Minos sometimes living in caves on Crete. The royal title ro-ja is read on several documents, including on stone libation tables from the sanctuaries, where it follows the name of the main god, Asirai (which would be equivalent to Sanskrit Asura, and of Avestan Ahura).

There is a name in Minoan Linear A mi-nu-te that may be related to Minos.

Some 19th-century scholars proposed a connection between Minos and the names of other ancient founder-kings, such as Menes of Egypt, Mannus of Germany, and Manu of India, and even with Meon of Phrygia and Lydia (after him named Maeonia), Mizraim of Egypt in the Book of Genesis and the Canaanite deity Baal.

Another possibility is that Minos and his relatives would be dramatis personae in a local "astronomical myth." Telephassa (Minos's grandmother) means "far-shining"; Pasiphaë (Minos's wife, a daughter of Sun god Helios) means "all-shining" or "wide-shining"; Phaidra (Minos's daughter with Pasiphaë) means "bright, beaming" – all three containing a tangible Proto-Indo-European root *bheh2- 'to glow, shine,' which, in Greek, derives φαής phaés 'light' and related words. Minos's name would then signify a lunar deity in this context, thus connected to several words for a moon god in Indo-European languages.

Literary Minos 

Minos appears in Greek literature as the king of Knossos as early as Homer's Iliad and Odyssey. Thucydides tells us Minos was the most ancient man known to build a navy. He reigned over Crete and the islands of the Aegean Sea three generations before the Trojan War. He lived at Knossos for nine years, where he received instruction from Zeus in the legislation he gave to the island. He was the author of the Cretan constitution and the founder of its naval supremacy.

On the Athenian stage, Minos is a cruel tyrant, the heartless exactor of the tribute of Athenian youths to feed to the Minotaur; in revenge for the death of his son Androgeus during a riot (see Theseus).

Later rationalization
To reconcile the contradictory aspects of his character, as well as to explain how Minos governed Crete over a period spanning so many generations, two kings by the name of Minos were assumed by later poets and rationalizing mythologists, such as Diodorus Siculus and Plutarch— "putting aside the mythological element," as he claims— in his life of Theseus.

According to this view, the first King Minos was the son of Zeus and Europa and the brother of Rhadamanthys and Sarpedon. This was the 'good' king Minos, and he was held in such esteem by the Olympian gods that, after he died, he was made one of the three 'Judges of the Dead,' alongside his brother Rhadamanthys and half-brother Aeacus. The wife of this 'Minos I' was said to be Itone (daughter of Lyctius) or Crete (a nymph or daughter of his stepfather Asterion), and he had a single son named Lycastus, his successor as King of Crete.

Lycastus had a son named Minos, after his grandfather, born by Lycastus' wife, Ida, daughter of Corybas.  This 'Minos II'— the 'bad' king Minos— is the son of this Lycastus, and was a far more colorful character than his father and grandfather. To this Minos, we owe the myths of Theseus, Pasiphaë, the Minotaur, Daedalus, Glaucus, and Nisus. Unlike Minos I, Minos II fathered numerous children, including Androgeus, Catreus, Deucalion, Ariadne, Phaedra, and Glaucus—all born to him by his wife, Pasiphaë. Through Deucalion, he was the grandfather of King Idomeneus, who led the Cretans to the Trojan War.

Possible historical element

Doubtless, there is a considerable historical element in the legend, perhaps in the Phoenician origin of Europa; it is possible that Athens and Mycenae were once culturally bound to the kings of Knossos, as Minoan objects appear at Mycenaean sites.

Minos himself is said to have died at Camicus in Sicily, where he had gone in pursuit of Daedalus, who had given Ariadne a clue by which she guided Theseus through the labyrinth. He was killed by the daughter of Cocalus, king of Agrigentum, who poured boiling water over him while he was taking a bath. Subsequently, his remains were sent back to the Cretans, who placed them in a sarcophagus, on which was inscribed: "The tomb of Minos, the son of Zeus."

The earlier legend knows Minos as a benevolent ruler, legislator, and suppressor of piracy. His constitution was said to have formed the basis of that of Lycurgus for Sparta. Following this, after his death, he became the judge of the shades in the underworld. In later versions, Aeacus and Rhadamanthus were also made judges, with Minos leading as the "appeals court" judge.

Family 
By his wife, Pasiphaë (or some say Crete), he fathered Ariadne, Androgeus, Deucalion, Phaedra, Glaucus, Catreus, Acacallis, and Xenodice.

By a nymph, Pareia, he had four sons, Eurymedon, Nephalion, Chryses, and Philolaus, who Heracles killed in revenge for the murder of the latter's two companions.

By Dexithea, one of the Telchines, he had a son called Euxanthius.

By Androgeneia of Phaestus, he had Asterion, who commanded the Cretan contingent in the war between Dionysus and the Indians. Also given as his children are Euryale, possibly the mother of Orion with Poseidon, and Pholegander, eponym of the island Pholegandros.

Minos, along with his brothers, Rhadamanthys and Sarpedon, was raised by King Asterion (or Asterius) of Crete. When Asterion died, his throne was claimed by Minos, who, according to some sources, banished his brothers.

Mythological Minos 

Asterion, king of Crete, adopted the three sons of Zeus and Europa: Minos, Sarpedon, and Rhadamanthus. According to the Odyssey (Book XIX l. 203, as interpreted by Plato in Laws 624), Minos consulted with Zeus every nine years. He got his laws straight from Zeus himself. When Minos' son Androgeos won the Panathenaic Games, the king, Aegeus, sent him to Marathon to fight a bull, resulting in the death of Androgeos. Outraged, Minos went to Athens to avenge his son, and on the way, he camped at Megara, where Nisos lived. Learning that Nisos' strength came from his hair, Minos gained the love of Scylla and her aid in cutting off her father's hair so that he could conquer the city. After his triumph, he punished Scylla for her treachery against her father by tying her to a boat and dragging her until she drowned. On arriving in Attica, he asked Zeus to punish the city, and the god struck it with plague and hunger. An oracle told the Athenians to meet any of Minos' demands if they wanted to escape the punishment. Minos then asked Athens to send seven boys and seven girls to Crete every nine years to be sacrificed to the Minotaur, the offspring from the zoophilic encounter of Minos' wife Pasiphaë with a certain bull that the king refused to surrender to Poseidon, which he had placed within a labyrinth he commanded his architect Daedalus to build. The Minotaur was defeated by the hero Theseus with the help of Minos' daughter Ariadne.

Glaucus 

Glaucus was playing with a ball or mouse and suddenly disappeared one day. The Curetes told the Cretans, "A marvelous creature has been born amongst you: whoever finds the true likeness of this creature will also find the child."

Polyidus of Argos observed the similarity of a newborn calf in Minos' herd, colored white and red and black, to the ripening of the fruit of the bramble plant, and so Minos sent him to find Glaucus.

Searching for the boy, Polyidus saw an owl driving bees away from a wine cellar in Minos' palace. Inside the wine cellar was a cask of honey, with Glaucus dead inside. Minos demanded Glaucus be brought back to life, though Polyidus objected.  Minos shut Polyidus up in the wine cellar with a sword. When a snake appeared nearby, Polyidus killed it with the sword. Another snake came for the first, and after seeing its mate dead, the second serpent left and brought back an herb, bringing the first snake back to life. Following this example, Polyidus used the same herb to resurrect Glaucus.

Minos refused to let Polyidus leave Crete until he taught Glaucus the art of divination. Polyidus did so, but then, at the last moment before leaving, he asked Glaucus to spit in his mouth. Glaucus did so and forgot everything he had been taught.

Poseidon, Daedalus and Pasiphaë 

Minos justified his accession as king and prayed to Poseidon for a sign. Poseidon sent a giant white bull out of the sea. Minos was committed to sacrificing the bull to Poseidon but then decided to substitute a different bull. Poseidon cursed Pasiphaë, Minos' wife, in rage, with a mad passion for the bull. Daedalus built her a wooden cow, which she hid inside. The bull mated with the wooden cow, and Pasiphaë was impregnated by the bull, giving birth to a horrible monster, again named Asterius, the Minotaur, half-man half bull. Daedalus then built a complicated "chamber that with its tangled windings perplexed the outward way" called the Labyrinth, and Minos put the Minotaur in it. To make sure no one would ever know the secret of who the Minotaur was and how to get out of the Labyrinth (Daedalus knew both of these things), Minos imprisoned Daedalus and his son, Icarus, along with the monster. Daedalus and Icarus flew away on wings Daedalus invented, but Icarus' wings melted because he flew too close to the sun. Icarus fell into the sea and drowned.

Theseus 

Minos' son Androgeus won every game in a contest hosted by Aegeas of Athens. Alternatively, the other contestants were jealous of Androgeus and killed him. Minos was angry and declared war on Athens. He offered the Athenians peace if they sent Minos seven young men and seven virgin maidens to feed the Minotaur yearly (which corresponded directly to the Minoans' meticulous records of lunar alignments - a full moon falls on the equinoxes once every eight years). This continued until Theseus killed the Minotaur with the help of Ariadne, Minos' lovestruck daughter.

Nisus 
Minos was also part of the King Nisus story. Nisus was King of Megara and was invincible as long as a lock of crimson hair still existed, hidden in his white hair. Minos attacked Megara, but Nisus knew he could not be beaten because he still had his lock of crimson hair. His daughter, Scylla, fell in love with Minos and proved it by cutting the crimson hair off her father's head. Nisus died, and Megara fell to Crete. Minos spurned Scylla for disobeying her father. She was changed into a shearer bird, relentlessly pursued by her father, who was a falcon.

Death 

Minos searched for Daedalus by traveling from city to city, asking a riddle; he presented a spiral seashell and asked for it to be strung all the way through. When he reached Camicus, Sicily, King Cocalus, knowing Daedalus would be able to solve the riddle, fetched the old man. He tied the string to an ant, which walked through the seashell, stringing it all the way through. Minos then knew Daedalus was in the court of King Cocalus and demanded he is handed over. Cocalus managed to convince him to take a bath first; then Cocalus' daughters and Daedalus, with Minos trapped in the tub, scalded him to death with boiling water.

After his death, Minos became a judge of the dead in Hades together with Aeacus and Rhadamanthus. Rhadamanthus judged the souls of Asians, Aeacus judged Europeans, and Minos had the deciding vote.

Minos in art 

On Cretan coins, Minos is represented as bearded, wearing a diadem, curly-haired, haughty, and dignified, like the traditional portraits of his reputed father, Zeus. He frequently occurs on painted vases and sarcophagus bas-reliefs, with Aeacus and Rhadamanthus as underworld judges and in connection with the Minotaur and Theseus.

In Michelangelo's famous fresco, The Last Judgment (located in the Sistine Chapel), Minos appears as a judge of the underworld, surrounded by a crowd of devils.  With his tail coiled around him and two donkey ears (symbol of stupidity), Minos judges the damned as they are brought down to hell (see Inferno, Second Circle).

In poetry 

In the Aeneid of Virgil, Minos was the judge of those who had been given the death penalty on a false charge - Minos sits with a huge urn and decides whether a soul should go to Elysium or Tartarus with the help of a silent jury. Radamanthus, his brother, is a judge at Tartarus who decides upon suitable punishments for sinners there.

In Dante Alighieri's Divine Comedy story Inferno, Minos is depicted as having a snake-like tail. He sits at the entrance to the second circle in the Inferno, which is the beginning of Hell proper. There, he judges the sins of each soul and assigns it to its appropriate punishment by indicating the circle to which it must descend. He does this by circling his tail around his body the appropriate number of times. He can also speak to clarify the soul's location within the circle indicated by the wrapping of his tail.

Astronomy
Minor planet 6239 Minos is named after Minos.

See also
 Minos, a dialogue attributed to Plato
 Menes a pharaoh of the Early Dynastic Period of ancient Egypt
 Chinvat Bridge, the bridge of the dead in Persian cosmology
 Sraosha, Mithra and Rashnu, guardians and judges of souls in Zoroastrian tradition

Footnotes

Notes

References
 Apollodorus, Apollodorus, The Library, with an English Translation by Sir James George Frazer, F.B.A., F.R.S. in 2 Volumes, Cambridge, MA, Harvard University Press; London, William Heinemann Ltd. 1921.
 Herodotus, Herodotus, with an English translation by A. D. Godley, Cambridge. Harvard University Press. 1920.
 Homer, The Iliad with an English Translation by A.T. Murray, PhD in two volumes, Cambridge, MA., Harvard University Press; London, William Heinemann, Ltd. 1924.
 Homer, The Odyssey with an English Translation by A.T. Murray, PH.D. in two volumes. Cambridge, MA., Harvard University Press; London, William Heinemann, Ltd. 1919.
 Hyginus, Gaius Julius, The Myths of Hyginus. Edited and translated by Mary A. Grant, Lawrence: University of Kansas Press, 1960.
 Smith, William; Dictionary of Greek and Roman Biography and Mythology, London (1873). "Minos 1.", "Minos 2."
 Thucydides, Thucydides translated into English; with introduction, marginal analysis, notes, and indices, Volume 1., Benjamin Jowett. translator. Oxford. Clarendon Press. 1881.
 Ziolkowski, Theodore, Minos and the Moderns: Cretan Myth in Twentieth-century Literature and Art. (Oxford/New York: Oxford University Press, 2008). Pp. xii, 173 (Classical Presences).
 Kelides,Yianni Minos SA: A study of the mind. (Minos SA University: I love Greece Club, 2000 BC). Pp. xii, 173 (Classical Presences).

External links

 
 The death of Minos in Sicily

Demigods in classical mythology
Agenorides
Children of Zeus
Princes in Greek mythology
Kings of Crete
Kings in Greek mythology
Underworld gods
Chthonic beings
Greek judges of the dead
Characters in Book VI of the Aeneid
Deeds of Poseidon
Cretan characters in Greek mythology
Knossos